Kervin Fabián Arriaga Villanueva (born 5 January 1998) is a Honduran professional footballer who plays as a defensive midfielder for Major League Soccer club Minnesota United and the Honduras national team.

Club career
Arriaga made his debut for Platense F.C. on 5 February 2017 in a 3–1 win over Juticalpa F.C. in the Clausura tournament. He scored his first goal the following 12 April against C.D. Real Sociedad in a 1–1 draw.

On 23 July 2019, Arriaga signed with C.D. Marathón. He made his debut the following 17 August in the 1–0 victory against Lobos UPNFM. He scored his first goal on 28 September against F.C. Motagua in a 2–1 win.

On 16 February 2022, Arriaga signed a two-year deal with Major League Soccer side Minnesota United.

International career
Arriaga made his national team debut on 10 October 2020 in a friendly against Nicaragua.

International goals
Scores and results list Honduras' goal tally first.

Honours
Platense
Honduran Cup: 2018

Honduras U23
Pan American Silver Medal: 2019

References

External links
 

1998 births
Living people
Association football midfielders
Honduran footballers
Platense F.C. players
C.D. Marathón players
Minnesota United FC players
Honduras international footballers
People from Puerto Cortés
Pan American Games silver medalists for Honduras
Pan American Games medalists in football
Footballers at the 2019 Pan American Games
Medalists at the 2019 Pan American Games
Liga Nacional de Fútbol Profesional de Honduras players
Major League Soccer players